Whiting Petroleum Corporation was a company engaged in hydrocarbon exploration primarily in the Bakken Formation and Three Forks Shale. It was organized in Delaware with its operational headquarters in Denver, Colorado.

History
The company was founded in 1980 by Kenneth R. Whiting and Bert Ladd.

In 1992, Alliant Energy, a Midwest public utility, acquired the company for $27.5 million.

In 2003, the company became a public company via an initial public offering which raised over $400 million. In 2005, the company acquired assets in the North Ward Estes field for $459 million. The property was sold in 2016 for $300 million.

In July 2013, the company sold assets in the Oklahoma Panhandle to BreitBurn Energy Partners for $846 million. In August 2013, the company acquired assets in the Williston Basin for $260 million. In 2014, the company acquired Kodiak Oil & Gas.

In January 2017, the company sold midstream assets in North Dakota for $375 million. In August 2017, the company sold its assets near the Fort Berthold Indian Reservation in North Dakota for $500 million.

On April 1, 2020, the company filed bankruptcy in the U.S. Bankruptcy Court for the Southern District of Texas. On September 1, 2020, the company emerged from bankruptcy and appointed Lynn A. Peterson as CEO.

Environmental issues 
In 2022, the company had a crude oil spill in marshland near Stanley, North Dakota. An EPA analysis in 2021 found that the Whiting company had over double the Emission intensity of other oil and gas companies in the United States.

References

External links

1980 establishments in Colorado
2003 initial public offerings
Companies based in Denver
Companies listed on the New York Stock Exchange
Companies that filed for Chapter 11 bankruptcy in 2020
Energy companies established in 1980
Oil companies of the United States
2022 mergers and acquisitions